William Albert Dembski (born July 18, 1960) is an American mathematician, philosopher and theologian. He was a proponent of intelligent design (ID) pseudoscience, specifically the concept of specified complexity, and was a senior fellow of the Discovery Institute's Center for Science and Culture (CSC). On September 23, 2016, he officially retired from intelligent design, resigning all his "formal associations with the ID community, including [his] Discovery Institute fellowship of 20 years". A February 2021 interview in the CSC's blog Evolution News announced "his return to the intelligent design arena".

In 2012, he taught as the Phillip E. Johnson Research Professor of Science and Culture at the Southern Evangelical Seminary in Matthews, North Carolina near Charlotte.

Dembski has written books about intelligent design, including The Design Inference (1998), Intelligent Design: The Bridge Between Science & Theology (1999), The Design Revolution (2004), The End of Christianity (2009), and Intelligent Design Uncensored (2010).

Intelligent design is the argument that an intelligent cause is responsible for the complexity of life and that one can detect that cause empirically. Dembski postulated that probability theory can be used to prove irreducible complexity (IC) and what he called "specified complexity." The scientific community sees intelligent design—and Dembski's concept of specified complexity—as a form of creationism attempting to portray itself as science.

Biography 
Dembski was born in Chicago, Illinois, the only child of Catholic parents, his mother an art dealer and his father a college professor and lecturer. His father held a D.Sc. in biology from the University of Erlangen-Nuremberg and taught evolutionary biology; while growing up Dembski was neither particularly religious nor did he question the theory of evolution. He attended an all-male Catholic preparatory school in Chicago. Dembski finished high school a year early, excelling in math and finishing a calculus course in one summer. After high school he attended the University of Chicago. There, Dembski experienced educational and personal difficulties, struggling with the advanced courses and finding the unfamiliar social milieu of college challenging. Dembski dropped out of school and worked at his mother's art business while reading works on creationism and the Bible. Finding the creationist works interesting in their challenge of evolution but their literal interpretations lacking, Dembski returned to school at the University of Illinois at Chicago, studying statistics.

It was in 1988 at a conference on randomness that Dembski began to believe that there was purpose, order, and design in the universe by the intervention of God. Remaining in academia, Dembski ultimately completed an undergraduate degree in psychology (1981, University of Illinois at Chicago) and master's degrees in statistics, mathematics, and philosophy (1983, University of Illinois at Chicago; 1985, University of Chicago; 1993, University of Illinois at Chicago, respectively), two PhDs, one in mathematics and one in philosophy (1988, University of Chicago; 1996, University of Illinois at Chicago, respectively), and a Master of Divinity in theology at the Princeton Theological Seminary (1996).

At the Princeton Theological Seminary, Dembski met his future wife, Jana. Dissatisfied with what he called the "free-swinging academic style" of the school, Dembski also was involved in a group known as the Charles Hodge Society. Based on the works of the 19th century thinker Charles Hodge, the group was devoted to strengthening the faith of students faced with what members believed to be the "theological disarray" of the times, and to providing an example of how to oppose "false and destructive ideas." It published a journal (a recreation of the Princeton Theological Review (1903–1929)) and met with considerable opposition on the campus, facing two lawsuits, threats of violence, accusations of racism and sexism; being denied funding; and hearing that membership "jeopardized their academic advancement."

Dembski and Jana have one daughter and two sons. One of his sons has autism and Dembski has attributed some of his son's problems to vaccines.

Early opposition to evolution
Dembski holds that his knowledge of statistics and his skepticism concerning evolutionary theory led him to believe that the extraordinary diversity of life was statistically unlikely to have been produced by natural selection. His first significant contribution to intelligent design was his 1991 paper, "Randomness by Design," published in the philosophy journal Noûs.

Former UC Berkeley law school professor Phillip E. Johnson's book Darwin on Trial (1991) attracted a group of scholars who shared his view that the exclusion of supernatural explanations by the scientific method was unfair and had led to the Edwards v. Aguillard ruling that teaching creation science in public schools was unconstitutional. Dembski was part of that group at a symposium at Southern Methodist University in Dallas, Texas, in March 1992, before they came to call themselves "The Wedge."

Dembski  wrote a contribution to the 1994 book The Creation Hypothesis. Another chapter, contributed by the creationists Charles Thaxton and Walter L Bradley, discussed "design detection" and redefined "specified complexity" as a way of measuring information.
These ideas led to Dembski's notion of specified complexity, which he developed in The Design Inference, a 1998 revision of his PhD dissertation in philosophy.

In 1987, the phrase "intelligent design" replaced "creation science" in drafts of a book, Of Pandas and People, that was intended for secondary school students. The phrase referred to the idea that life was created through unspecified processes by an intelligent but unidentified designer. The book asserted that there was a logical need for such a designer because of the appearance of design in biological organisms. This replacement was intended to evade the Edwards v. Aguillard ruling. The book was published in 1989 amidst campaigning by the publisher for the introduction of "intelligent design" into school science classes.

Biochemist Michael Behe, another member of "The Wedge," contributed the argument that he subsequently called "irreducible complexity" to a subsequent edition of Pandas in 1993. The book contained concepts which Dembski later elaborated in his treatment of "specified complexity."

Discovery Institute

After completing graduate school in 1996, Dembski was unable to secure a university position; from then until 1999 he received what he calls "a standard academic salary" of $40,000 a year as a Postdoctoral Research Fellow at the Discovery Institute's Center for Science and Culture. "I was one of the early beneficiaries of Discovery largess," says Dembski.

Until September 2016, Dembski served as a senior fellow at the CSC, where he played a central role in the center's extensive public and political campaigns advancing the concept of intelligent design and its teaching in public schools through its "Teach the Controversy" campaign as part of the institute's wedge strategy. He has since resigned his fellowship position with the Discovery Institute.

Baylor University

Michael Polanyi Center controversy

In 1999, Dembski was invited by Robert B. Sloan, President of Baylor University, to establish the Michael Polanyi Center at the university. Named after the Hungarian physical chemist and philosopher Michael Polanyi (1891–1976), Dembski described it as "the first intelligent design think tank at a research university." Dembski had known Sloan for about three years, having taught Sloan's daughter at a Christian study summer camp not far from Waco, Texas. Sloan was the first Baptist minister to serve as Baylor's president in over 30 years, had read some of Dembski's work and liked it; according to Dembski, Sloan "made it clear that he wanted to get me on the faculty in some way."  The salaries were supported by a grant from the John Templeton Foundation.

The Polanyi Center was established without much publicity in October 1999, initially consisting of two people – Dembski and a like-minded colleague, Bruce L. Gordon, who were hired directly by Sloan without going through the usual channels of a search committee and departmental consultation. The vast majority of Baylor staff did not know of the center's existence until its website went online, and the center stood outside of the existing religion, science, and philosophy departments.

The center's mission, and the lack of consultation with the Baylor faculty, became the immediate subject of controversy. The faculty feared for the university's reputation – it has historically been well regarded for its contributions to mainstream science – and scientists outside the university questioned whether Baylor had "gone fundamentalist." Faculty members pointed out that the university's existing interdisciplinary Institute for Faith and Learning was already addressing questions about the relationship between science and religion, making the existence of the Polanyi Center somewhat redundant. In April 2000, Dembski hosted a conference on "naturalism in science" sponsored by the John Templeton Foundation and the hub of the intelligent design movement, the Discovery Institute, seeking to address the question "Is there anything beyond nature?" Most of the Baylor faculty boycotted the conference.

A few days later, the Baylor faculty senate voted by a margin of 27–2 to ask the administration to dissolve the center and merge it with the Institute for Faith and Learning. President Sloan refused, citing issues of censorship and academic integrity, but agreed to convene an outside committee to review the center. The committee recommended setting up a faculty advisory panel to oversee the science and religion components of the program, dropping the name "Michael Polanyi" and reconstituting the center as part of the Institute for Faith and Learning. These recommendations were accepted in full by the university administration.

In a subsequent press release, Dembski asserted that the committee had given an "unqualified affirmation of my own work on intelligent design," that its report "marks the triumph of intelligent design as a legitimate form of academic inquiry" and that "dogmatic opponents of design who demanded the Center be shut down have met their Waterloo. Baylor University is to be commended for remaining strong in the face of intolerant assaults on freedom of thought and expression."

Dembski's remarks were criticized by other members of the Baylor faculty, who protested that they were both an unjustified attack on his critics at Baylor and a false assertion that the university endorsed Dembski's controversial views on intelligent design. Charles Weaver, a professor of psychology and neuroscience at Baylor and one of the most vocal critics of the Polanyi Center, commented: "In academic arguments, we don't seek utter destruction and defeat of our opponents. We don't talk about Waterloos."

President Sloan asked Dembski to withdraw his press release, but Dembski refused, accusing the university of "intellectual McCarthyism" (borrowing a phrase that Sloan himself had used when they first tried to dissolve the center). He declared that the university's action had been taken "in the utmost of bad faith ... thereby providing the fig leaf of justification for my removal." Professor Michael Beaty, director of the Institute for Faith and Learning, said that Dembski's remarks violated the spirit of cooperation that the committee had advocated and stated that "Dr. Dembski's actions after the release of the report compromised his ability to serve as director." Dembski was removed as the center's director, although he remained an associate research professor until May 2005. He was not asked to teach any courses in that time and instead worked from home, writing books and speaking around the country. "In a sense, Baylor did me a favor," he said. "I had a five-year sabbatical."

Seminary teaching

From 1999 to 2005, he was on the faculty of Baylor University, where he was a focus of attention and controversy. During the academic year 2005–2006, he was briefly the Carl F. H. Henry Professor of Theology and Science at the Southern Baptist Theological Seminary in Louisville, Kentucky, as well as the first director of the school's new Center for Theology and Science (since replaced by prominent creationist Kurt Wise). The seminary teaches creationism but its professors vary on the details, with most adhering to the young Earth creationist viewpoint of a relatively recent creation which occurred literally as described in Genesis; Dembski does not hold to young Earth creationism (YEC). On his position at Southern, Dembski also remarked that "Theology is where my ultimate passion is and I think that is where I can uniquely contribute." He left Southern in May 2006. Starting in June 2006 he became a professor in philosophy at Southwestern Baptist Theological Seminary (SWBTS) in Fort Worth, Texas. Since taking up a position within Southwestern's School of Theology in June 2006, Dembski has taught a number of courses within its Department of Philosophy of Religion. For some of his courses, he requires that his students promote intelligent design on "hostile" websites for course credit. The Southern Baptist Convention operates both seminaries.

In September 2007, the SWBTS hosted a conference, "Intelligent Design in Business Practice," presented by Dembski, Acton Institute theologian Jay Richards, and three business academics presently or formerly teaching at universities in the Southern United States.

Mims–Pianka controversy

On April 2, 2006, Dembski stated on his blog that he reported Eric Pianka to the Department of Homeland Security because he and fellow Discovery Institute Fellow Forrest Mims felt that Pianka's speech while accepting the Texas Academy of Science's Distinguished Texas Scientist Award in 2006 fomented bioterrorism. This resulted in the Federal Bureau of Investigation interviewing Pianka in Austin. On April 5, Dembski wagered that Pianka's popularity would drop if the full text of his speech to the Texas Academy of Science were made public.

Baylor Evolutionary Informatics Lab controversy
Subsequently, in July and August 2007, Dembski played a central role in the formation of the Evolutionary Informatics Lab (EIL), cofounded with Baylor University Engineering Professor Robert J. Marks II. According to Baylor administration, the EIL website hosted at Baylor was deleted because it violated university policy forbidding professors from creating the impression that their personal views represent Baylor as an institution. Dembski says the website was removed because it dealt with intelligent design. Baylor said they would permit Marks to repost his website on their server, provided a 108-word disclaimer accompany any intelligent design-advancing research to make clear that the work does not represent the university's position. The site now resides on a third-party server and still contains the material advancing intelligent design. Dembski's participation was funded by a $30,000 grant from the Lifeworks Foundation, which is controlled by researcher Brendan Dixon of the Biologic Institute (which has close ties to the Discovery Institute).

Southwestern Baptist Theological Seminary flood controversy
While serving as a professor at Southwestern Baptist Theological Seminary, Dembski wrote The End of Christianity, which argued that a Christian can reconcile an old Earth creationist view with a literal reading of Adam and Eve in the Bible by accepting the scientific consensus of a 4.5 billion year of Earth. He further argued that Noah's flood likely was a phenomenon limited to the Middle East. This caused controversy and Dembski's reading of the Bible was criticized by Tom Nettles, a young Earth creationist, in The Southern Baptist Journal of Theology, Southern Seminary's official theological journal. In 2010, the dean of Southwestern's School of Theology, David Allen, "released a White Paper through the seminary's Center for Theological Research defending Dembski as within the bounds of orthodoxy and critiquing Nettles for misunderstanding the book. The paper included Dembski's statement admitting error regarding Noah's flood." Southwestern Seminary president Paige Patterson, a young Earth creationist, "said that when Dembski's questionable statements came to light, he convened a meeting with Dembski and several high-ranking administrators at the seminary. At that meeting, Dembski was quick to admit that he was wrong about the flood. "'Had I had any inkling that Dr. Dembski was actually denying the absolute trustworthiness of the Bible, then that would have, of course, ended his relationship with the school,' he said."

Public advocacy

In December 2001, Dembski launched the International Society for Complexity, Information and Design (ISCID), of which he is Executive Director. Dembski is also the editor-in-chief of ISCID's journal, Progress in Complexity, Information, and Design (PCID), which appears to have ceased publication with its November 2005 issue. He has several more books in preparation as well as producing an Adobe Flash animation mocking Judge John E. Jones III, who presided in the landmark 2005 Kitzmiller v. Dover Area School District case. He is also a member of American Scientific Affiliation, the Evangelical Philosophical Society, and the American Mathematical Society, and is a senior fellow of the Wilberforce Forum.

Dembski frequently gives public talks, principally to religious, pro-ID groups, and creationists. Barbara Forrest and Paul R. Gross noted that Dembski has not been hesitant in associating with young Earth creationists, such as attending conferences with Carl Baugh. His lectures have been met with criticism: a presentation he made to the University of Oklahoma was funded by Trinity Baptist Church in Norman, Oklahoma, as a "gospel investment" but university faculty instructors criticised Dembski's presentation as half-hearted, lackluster, containing numerous errors and distortions, lacking positive evidence for intelligent design, and for evading questions.

Dembski, along with fellow Discovery Institute associates Michael Behe and David Berlinski, tutored Ann Coulter on science and evolution for her book Godless: The Church of Liberalism (2006). Approximately one-third of the book is devoted to polemical attacks on evolution, which Coulter, as Dembski often does, terms "Darwinism."

Dembski participated in the documentary film Expelled: No Intelligence Allowed, released in 2008. Dembski told the Southern Baptist Texan that those who need to see the movie are the "parents of children in high school or college, as well as those children themselves, who may think that the biological sciences are a dispassionate search for truth about life but many of whose practitioners see biology, especially evolutionary biology, as an ideological weapon to destroy faith in God." Dembski has appeared on several television shows, including a 2005 interview with Jon Stewart on The Daily Show with Edward Larson and Ellie Crystal where he said he accepted religion before science.

Writing

In 1998, Dembski published his first book, The Design Inference: Eliminating Chance through Small Probabilities, which became a Cambridge University Press bestselling philosophical monograph.

In 2002, Dembski published his book No Free Lunch: Why Specified Complexity Cannot Be Purchased without Intelligence. Dembski's work was strongly criticized within the scientific community, which argued that there were a number of major logical inconsistencies and evidential gaps in Dembski's hypothesis. David Wolpert, co-creator of the No free lunch theorem on which Dembski based his book, characterized his arguments as "fatally informal and imprecise," "written in jello," reminiscent of philosophical discussion "of art, music, and literature, as well as much of ethics" rather than of scientific debate.

Mathematician Mark Perakh has stated he believes Dembski overemphasizes his own self-importance in his writing.

Peer-review controversy
One of the common objections to intelligent design being accepted as valid science is that ID proponents have published no scientific papers in the peer-reviewed scientific literature in support of their conjectures. The ruling in the 2005 Dover trial, Kitzmiller v. Dover Area School District, found that intelligent design had not been tested by the process of being published in a peer-reviewed scientific journal and was not supported by any peer-reviewed research, data or publications. Despite the Dover trial ruling, the Discovery Institute lists Dembski's 1998 book The Design Inference under the heading "Peer-Reviewed Scientific Books Supportive of Intelligent Design Published by Trade Presses or University Presses." The Discovery Institute describes Dembski as a mathematician and philosopher, who includes in his credentials a B.A. in psychology and postdoctoral work in mathematics, physics and computer science.

In an expert report, computer scientist and number theorist Jeffrey Shallit states that despite common claims in the popular and religious press, Dembski is not a scientist by any reasonable standard, has not published any experimental or empirical tests of his claims, submitted his claims to the scrutiny of his peers or been published in a scientific journal. In a footnote, Shallit states that he does not consider mathematics to be science. Shallit describes Dembski's published mathematical output as "extremely small" for a research mathematician and remarks that "it is very unlikely that his meagre output would merit tenure at any major university."

Since Shallit's statement, Dembski has (as of May 2010) published four peer-reviewed papers in information theory venues associated with the IEEE professional society. The papers deal with active information in the context of searches for solutions to problems. Quantified active information is introduced in "Conservation of Information in Search: Measuring the Cost of Success." A second paper, "Evolutionary Synthesis of Nand Logic: Dissecting a Digital Organism," claims to deconstruct the evolution simulation Avida by uncovering the sources of active information in the program. A third paper discusses the role of Jacob Bernoulli's principle of indifference in the analysis of evolution. The most recent paper, "Efficient Per Query Information Extraction from a Hamming Oracle," calculates the performance of various search algorithms which use the Hamming distance to search for a single string of a certain length in the set of all strings of this length.

Dembski states that his book The Design Inference has also been peer-reviewed: "This book was published by Cambridge University Press and peer-reviewed as part of a distinguished monograph series, Cambridge Studies in Probability, Induction, and Decision Theory." In his expert report, Shallit states, "I know that book manuscripts typically do not receive the same sort of scrutiny that research articles do. ...it is not uncommon for a 10-page paper to receive 5 pages or more of comments, whereas a book manuscript of two hundred pages often receives about the same number...." In addition, Mark Isaak claims that Dembski's book was reviewed by philosophers and not biologists.

The Inner Life of the Cell copyright controversy
In November 2007, a graduate student named S. A. Smith brought an apparent case of wholesale academic misuse of unlicensed content to public attention. She noticed that a video used by Dembski in his lecture was identical to The Inner Life of the Cell animation created by Harvard University and XVIVO Scientific Animation. The audio track giving a scientific explanation was stripped off and the video was used with an alternative narration. The matter was brought to the attention of Harvard and XVIVO. David Bolinsky, creator of the video, wrote that Dembski was warned about using the video without permission.

In response to the allegations, Dembski has claimed that he downloaded the video from the Internet, and added a voiceover narration that he deemed appropriate for his audience. According to Dembski, the downloaded version omitted the opening credits but contained the closing credits, which were shown to the audience. However, Smith later documented several instances where images from the Harvard/XVIVO animation were apparently removed from his book The Design of Life (2008) but the related footnotes and references were not. indicating that Dembski was already aware that permission had been denied for him to use the animation when he delivered his presentation at the University of Oklahoma.

On April 9, 2008, Expelled: No Intelligence Allowed, a movie Dembski appears in, was given a cease-and-desist by XVIVO accusing Premise Media, the Expelled producers, of plagiarism concerning the same video. A June 2008 Premise Media press release announced Premise Media and XVIVO, LLC, "reached an agreement" noting "XVIVO has agreed that the Premise Media documentary does not infringe on any of XVIVO's intellectual property rights."

Evolution

Dembski's views on evolution have been a source of considerable controversy within both the mainstream scientific and creationist communities. Dembski does not accept universal common descent. His mainstream scientific critics have accused him of dishonesty in his representation of scientific facts and writing, and he has also been criticised by the traditional creationist community for not supporting the young Earth creationist position, though this community does defend some of his other arguments.

Science vs. naturalism
Dembski objects to the presence of the theory of evolution in a variety of disciplines, presenting intelligent design as an alternative to reductionist materialism that gives a sense of purpose that the unguided evolutionary process lacks and the ultimate significance of ID is its success in undermining materialism and naturalism. Dembski has also stated that ID has little chance as a serious scientific theory as long as methodological naturalism is the basis for science. Although intelligent design proponents (including Dembski) have made little apparent effort to publish peer-reviewed scientific research to support their hypotheses, in recent years they have made vigorous efforts to promote the teaching of intelligent design in schools. Dembski is a strong supporter of this drive as a means of making young people more receptive to intelligent design, and said he wants "to see intelligent design flourish as a scientific research program" among a "new generation of scholars" willing to consider the theory and textbooks that include it.

Intelligent designer

Dembski's theories do not attempt to explain the origin of the intelligent designer that created the universe, which he argues is unnecessary, since such an intelligent designer is likely outside the dimensions of space and time which are the subject of empirical science.

He has not had any of his pro-intelligent-design articles published in peer-reviewed mainstream scientific journals. While intelligent design proponents often allege that such failure to be published is due to a pro-evolution bias or conspiracy, Dembski himself has said he prefers to disseminate his ideas in non-peer-reviewed media: "I've just gotten kind of blasé about submitting things to journals where you often wait two years to get things into print. And I find I can actually get the turnaround faster by writing a book and getting the ideas expressed there. My books sell well. I get a royalty. And the material gets read more."

In December 2007, Dembski told Focus on the Family that "The Designer of intelligent
design is, ultimately, the Christian God."

Specified complexity 

Specified complexity is an concept which Dembski has proposed and used in his works promoting intelligent design, an argument intended to give a formal definition of patterns that are both specified and complex. He claims it is a reliable marker of design by an intelligent agent, a central concept of intelligent design, as opposed to natural selection in modern evolutionary theory. The concept of specified complexity is widely regarded as mathematically unsound and has not been the basis for further independent work in information theory, complexity theory, or biology. Specified complexity is one of the two main arguments used by intelligent design proponents, the other being irreducible complexity.

Intelligent design and Christianity
Dembski's position on intelligent design's relationship with Christianity has been inconsistent. He has suggested that the "intelligent designer" is not necessarily synonymous with a god: "It could be space aliens. There are many possibilities," but has on several occasions been explicit in labelling the designer as the Christian god and linking ID with a religious revival through which Christianity can be restored to its formerly pre-eminent place in society, supplanting "materialist" science. In his book Intelligent Design: The Bridge Between Science & Theology he states "The conceptual soundings of the [intelligent design] theory can in the end only be located in Christ." On his website, DesignInference.com, Dembski said that intelligent design provides an intellectual basis to restore Christian philosophy over materialism.

Dembski has also spoken of his motivation for supporting intelligent design in a series of Sunday lectures in the Fellowship Baptist Church in Waco, Texas, the last of which took place on March 7, 2004. Answering a question, Dembski said it was to enable God to receive credit for creation.

Intelligent design movement
Dembski sees intelligent design as being a popular movement as well as a scientific hypothesis and claims that it is in the process of dislodging evolution from the public imagination. At the CSICOP's 4th World Skeptics Conference, held on June 20–23, 2002, in Burbank, California, he told the audience that "over the next twenty-five years ID will provide the greatest challenge to skepticism." He asserted that "ID is threatening to be mainstream," and that polls show 90 percent support for the hypothesis, indicating that it has "already becom[e] mainstream within the public themselves." "The usual skeptical retorts are not going to work against ID" and ID "turns the tables on skepticism." Evolution, in his view, "is the ultimate status quo" and "squelches dissent." Young people, who "love rebellion" see that and are attracted to ID as a result. "The public supports intelligent design. The public is tired of being bullied by an intellectual elite." He contends that skeptics resort to rhetoric and "artificially define ID out of science," admitting only materialistic explanations as legitimate. ID "paints the more appealing world picture," whereas skepticism works by being negative, which "doesn't set well with the public... To most people evolution doesn't provide a compelling view."

Bible code
Dembski has also indicated an interest in the Bible code. In a favorable book review of Jeffrey Satinover's Cracking the Bible Code (1997), Dembski wrote that "The philosopher Bertrand Russell was once asked why he didn't believe in God. He replied, 'Not enough evidence.' Satinover's fascination with the Bible Code is that it may provide evidence for God's existence that would have convinced even a Bertrand Russell."

Faith healing
Dembski once took his family to a meeting conducted by Todd Bentley, a faith healer, in hopes of receiving a "miraculous healing" for his son, who is autistic. In an article for the Baptist Press he recalled disappointment with the nature of the meeting and with the prevention of his son and other attendees from joining those in wheelchairs who were selected to receive prayer. He then concluded, "Minimal time was given to healing, though plenty was devoted to assaulting our senses with blaring insipid music and even to Bentley promoting and selling his own products (books and CDs)." He wrote that he did not regret the trip and called it an "education," which showed "how easily religion can be abused, in this case to exploit our family."

Responses to critics
Dembski previews material on the Internet for open peer review. This helps identify errors and address objections prior to publication, allowing him to get "the last word in the exchange." Dembski's style in response to his critics (particularly of his mathematical papers) is polemical. For instance, in reply to a critique of the "law of conservation of information" posted on talkreason.org, Dembski states: "I'm not and never have been in the business of offering a strict mathematical proof for the inability of material mechanisms to generate specified complexity in the same way that no physicist is in the business of offering a strict mathematical proof for the conservation of energy."

Publications

Books 

Sole author

Co-author

As editor or contributor

 "Papers from a conference, entitled Design and its Critics, held at Concordia University, Mequon, Wis., June 22–24, 2000."

Notes

References

Further reading

External links 

Official
 DesignInference.com – Dembski's website (with articles)
 William A. Dembski biography from the Discovery Institute
 Uncommon Descent – Dembski cofounded this blog
 The Evolutionary Informatics Lab – Dembski cofounded this lab with Robert J. Marks II

Reviews/analysis of Dembski
 "The Design Inference: Eliminating Chance through Small Probabilities" – a book review by William Lane Craig
 "How Not to Detect Design--- A Review of William Dembski's The Design Inference"  (PDF) – a book review by Branden Fitelson, Christopher Stephens, and Elliott Sober in Philosophy of Science (1999) 66: 472–488
 "Intelligent Design and Mathematical Statistics: A Troubled Alliance" (PDF) by Peter Olofsson in Biology and Philosophy (2008) 23 (4): 545–553
 "Probability, Statistics, Evolution, and Intelligent Design" (PDF) by Peter Olofsson in Chance (2008) 21 (3): 42–45
  – a book review by H. Allen Orr in Boston Review (Summer 2002) 27 (3–4)
 "A Free Lunch in a Mousetrap" by Mark Perakh
 "Dembski's mathematical achievements" by Jeffrey Shallit posted at The Panda's Thumb blog, May 12, 2004
 "No Free Lunch: Why Specified Complexity Cannot be Purchased Without Intelligence, William Dembski, Rowman and Littlefield, 2002" (PDF) – a book review by Jeffrey Shallit in BioSystems (June–July 2002) 66 (1–2): 93–99
 "An 'introduction', in-depth" – a book review by Lael Weinberger in Journal of Creation (April 2009) 23 (1): 25–29
 "The advantages of theft over toil: the design inference and arguing from ignorance" by John S. Wilkins and Wesley R. Elsberry. An unedited version of a paper published in Biology and Philosophy 16 (November 2001):711–724
 "The Design Inference from Specified Complexity Defended by Scholars Outside the Intelligent Design Movement" by Peter S. Williams at the Evangelical Philosophical Society

Biographical information
 : Chaos, Uniform Probability, and Weak Convergence (1988), PhD dissertation, University of Chicago

Other
 

1960 births
Living people
20th-century American mathematicians
21st-century American mathematicians
American theologians
Christian apologists
Evangelical theologians
Evangelical writers
Discovery Institute fellows and advisors
Fellows of the International Society for Complexity, Information, and Design
Intelligent design advocates
Southwestern Baptist Theological Seminary faculty
University of Illinois Chicago alumni